Furkan Yalçınkaya (born August 12, 1986 in İstanbul) is a Turkish volleyball player. He is 199 cm. He plays for Fenerbahçe Istanbul Team since 2007 season start and wear 17 number. He played 16 times for national team. He also played for Arçelik and Manavgat Belediyespor.

External links
 Player profile at fenerbahce.org

References

1986 births
Living people
Volleyball players from Istanbul
Turkish men's volleyball players
Fenerbahçe volleyballers
Arçelik volleyballers
Manavgat Belediyespor volleyballers
21st-century Turkish people